For Those Who Can Tell No Tales is a 2013 Bosnian drama film directed by Jasmila Žbanić. It was screened in the Special Presentation section at the 2013 Toronto International Film Festival.

Cast
Kym Vercoe as Kym Vercoe
Boris Isaković as Police Inspector
Simon McBurney as Tim Clancy
Branko Cvejić as Museum Guide
Leon Lučev as Veljko
Jasna Đuričić as Edina
Pamela Rabe as Mum

References

External links

2013 films
2013 drama films
Bosnian-language films
Films directed by Jasmila Žbanić
Bosnia and Herzegovina drama films